Schultze is a German surname. Notable people with the surname include:

Bernhard Sigmund Schultze (1827–1919), German gynecologist
Charles Schultze (1924–2016), U.S. economist
Ernst Schulze (disambiguation) several people including:
 Ernst Schulze (poet), a German Romantic poet
 Gottlob Ernst Schulze, a German philosopher
 Ernst Schulze (chemist), a German Chemist and the grandson of Gottlob Ernst Schulze
 Sadananda, born Ernst-Georg Schulze, a German Gaudiya Vaishnavist swami
Fritz Schultze (1846–1908), German philosopher
Gottlob Ernst Schulze (1761–January 1833), German philosopher, grandfather of biochemist Ernst Schulze
Max Schultze (1825–1874), German microscopic anatomist
Norbert Schultze (1911–2002), German composer of film music
Sven Schultze (born 1978), German basketball player

See also 
Schultze Gets the Blues, a 2003 film directed and written by Michael Schorr

German-language surnames